My Turn is the second studio album by American rapper Lil Baby. It was released on February 28, 2020, by Capitol Records, Motown Records, Wolfpack Music Group, and Quality Control Music. The album features guest appearances from Gunna, 42 Dugg, Future, Lil Uzi Vert, Lil Wayne, Moneybagg Yo, Young Thug, and Rylo Rodriguez. It also features production from record producers such as Tay Keith, Quay Global, Section 8, Twysted Genius, Hit-Boy, DJ Paul, Murda Beatz, and Wheezy, among others. The album was supported by five singles: "Woah", "Sum 2 Prove", "Emotionally Scarred", "All In", and "The Bigger Picture". The latter song received two Grammy nominations at the 2021 Grammy Awards.

My Turn received generally favorable reviews and debuted atop the US Billboard 200, earning 197,000 album-equivalent units, becoming Lil Baby's first US number-one album. The album topped the chart for five weeks, making it one of the best performing albums of 2020. It also reached the top 10 in other countries, including Canada and the United Kingdom. The album was certified quadruple platinum in February 2022. A deluxe edition, featuring six additional tracks, was released on May 1, 2020.

Background
In October 2019, Lil Baby revealed plans to release his next studio album before the end of 2019, but was delayed until the following year. The album's artwork and release date were revealed in January 2020. Lil Baby took to Instagram Live and explained the album's title:

Promotion

Singles
The album's lead single, "Woah", was released for digital download on November 8, 2019. The song was produced by Quay Global. The music video was released on December 6, 2019. The song peaked at number 15 on the US Billboard Hot 100.

The album's second single, "Sum 2 Prove", was released on January 10, 2020. The song was produced by Twysted Genius. The music video was released on February 18, 2020. The song peaked at number 16 on the Billboard Hot 100.

"Emotionally Scarred" was serviced to rhythmic contemporary radio as the album's third single on April 15, 2020. The music video was released on April 30. The song peaked at number 31 on the Billboard Hot 100.

The album's fourth single, "All In", was released for digital download on April 23, 2020, as well an accompanying music video. The song peaked at number 45 on the Billboard Hot 100.

The album's fifth single, "The Bigger Picture", was released for digital download on June 12, 2020, as well an accompanying music video. The song peaked at number three on the Billboard Hot 100.

Promotional singles
The album's lead promotional single, "Catch the Sun", also from the Queen & Slim soundtrack, was released on November 15, 2019. The song was produced by Hit-Boy. The music video was released on January 29, 2020.

Other songs
A music video for the song, "Heatin Up" featuring frequent collaborator Gunna, was released on February 28, 2020, while the music video for "Forever" featuring Lil Wayne, was released on March 3, 2020. Both videos were directed by Jon J. The music video for "Grace" featuring 42 Dugg, was released on March 13, 2020. The music video for "No Sucker" featuring Moneybagg Yo, was released on April 10, 2020. The music video for "We Paid" featuring 42 Dugg, was released on May 6, 2020. The music video for "Forget That" featuring Rylo Rodriguez, was released on September 11, 2020.

Artwork
The artwork features a pastoral painting that illustrates Lil Baby atop a large jutting rock, with water, baby goats and greenery surrounding him. He's shown lighting up cannabis, the smoke adding to the haziness of the artwork.

Critical reception

My Turn was met with generally favorable reviews. At Metacritic, which assigns a normalized rating out of 100 to reviews from professional publications, the album received an average score of 66, based on five reviews.

AllMusic's critic Fred Thomas gave the album a positive review, praising Baby's vocal delivery as well as his flow on the album. Thomas further says that "Lil Baby manages to keep every moment fresh, finding a unique and unlikely midway between artistic inspiration and commercially viable entertainment". Writing for NME, Kyann-Sian Williams gave the album a mixed to positive review, praising many of the features on the album as well as Baby's delivery, although stating that the album "starts of a little slow and dreary". Furthermore, Williams said that the album "is an enjoyable collection of tracks for his loyal fans. He [Lil Baby] would do well, though, to stay away from the whiny sounds and rap with a little bit more clarity". Pitchforks critic Sheldon Pearce had mixed opinions regarding the album, saying that "the music is all work and no inspiration". He implied that Baby's songwriting and lyricism has improved, but also stating that he "doesn't really have any charisma, or flavor, or personality".

A. Harmony of Exclaim! said, "The stuffed effort could be Lil Baby's attempt to showcase his growth. But one mark of artistic maturity is exercising restraint – less is often more". Writing for Rolling Stone, Danny Schwartz gave the album an overall mixed review, commending Baby's lyrical skills, saying "Baby's great strength is that he conveys emotion effortlessly; he doesn't need to formally unpack old traumas to bear them out". However, Schwartz mentioned that the "excessive length" of My Turn results in "a lot of filler" songs. Nonetheless, he described these songs as "premium grade".

Year-end lists

Industry awards

Commercial performance
My Turn debuted at number one on the US Billboard 200 with 197,000 album-equivalent units (including just under 10,000 pure album sales) in its first week, marking Lil Baby's first US number-one album. Following My Turns first week of release, 12 songs off the album charted on the US Billboard Hot 100, which gave Lil Baby a career total of 47 songs on the chart, putting him at a tie with Prince and Paul McCartney. After logging 13 consecutive weeks in the top six, My Turn returned to number one on the Billboard 200, on the chart dated June 20, 2020. It stayed at the top spot for four additional weeks, topping the chart for five weeks in total. On February 28, 2022, My Turn was certified quadruple platinum by the Recording Industry Association of America (RIAA) for combined sales and album-equivalent units of over four million units in the United States. My Turn was the most consumed album of 2020 in the US, with 2.632 million album-equivalent units and 40,000 physical sales.

Track listing

Notes
  signifies an uncredited co-producer

Sample credits
 "Heatin Up" contains an uncredited interpolation from "Hot", written by Jeffery Williams and Sergio Kitchens, as performed by Young Thug and Gunna.
 "Gang Signs" contains elements from "Throw Your Sets", written by Paul Beauregard, as performed by Tear Da Club Up Thugs.
 "Humble" contains a sample from "Up Against the Wind", written by Christopher Young and David Goldsmith, as performed by Lori Perry.

Personnel
Credits adapted from the album's liner notes and Tidal.

 Matthew "Mattazik Muzik" Robinson – recording (all tracks)
 Todd Bergman – recording (track 15)
 Thomas "Tillie" Mann – mixing (all tracks)
 Stephen "DotCom" Farrow – mixing assistant (tracks 5, 6, 13)
 Princeton "Perfect Harmony" Terry – mixing assistant (tracks 1–19, 20)
 Chip Cannon – mixing assistant (tracks 1–4, 7–12, 14, 16–18, 20)
 Colin Leonard – mastering (tracks 1–14, 16–26)
 Ian Sefchick – mastering (track 15)

Charts

Weekly charts

Year-end charts

Certifications

Release history

References

2020 albums
Motown albums
Lil Baby albums
Capitol Records albums
Albums produced by DJ Paul
Albums produced by Hit-Boy
Albums produced by Tay Keith
Quality Control Music albums
Albums produced by Murda Beatz